George Law Cawkwell (25 October 1919 – 18 February 2019) was a classical scholar who  specialised in the ancient history of Greece in the 4th century BC.

Life and career
Born in Auckland, New Zealand, Cawkwell was educated at King's College, Auckland, and became head boy there. He attended the University of Auckland from 1938, gaining BA and MA degrees. He joined the army in 1942 during World War II and fought with the Fijian Infantry in the Solomons in 1944.

Cawkwell was a Rhodes Scholar at Oxford University, studying at Christ Church. He played in the position of lock for the  national rugby union team, gaining his cap in 1947. For most of his life, Cawkwell was a Fellow and Praelector in Ancient History of University College, Oxford. He was a Fellow from 1949 to 1987 and then became an Emeritus Fellow. He authored a number of books on ancient history. His students included the classical scholars Ernst Badian and Raphael Sealey. He won the Runciman Award in 1998 for his book Thucydides and the Peloponnesian War.

Cawkwell was the first "Procurator" of University College, fund-raising for the 750th anniversary of the college in 1999. The George Cawkwell Fellowship in Ancient History has been established at the college. A boat in the University College Boat Club is also named after him. His portrait was painted by the artist Daphne Todd.

George Cawkwell married Pat Clarke in 1945. The businessman and stock market commentator Simon Cawkwell (born 1946) is his son. Cawkwell died on 18 February 2019 at 99 years of age.

Selected books

Cawkwell's books include:

 Philip of Macedon. Faber and Faber, 1978. .
 Thucydides and the Peloponnesian War. Routledge, 1997. .
 The Greek Wars: The Failure of Persia. Oxford University Press, 2005. .

See also
 List of Scotland national rugby union players

References

1919 births
2019 deaths
Writers from Auckland
People educated at King's College, Auckland
University of Auckland alumni
New Zealand Rhodes Scholars
New Zealand emigrants to the United Kingdom
Alumni of Christ Church, Oxford
Scotland international rugby union players
Fellows of University College, Oxford
English classical scholars
English historians
Scholars of ancient Greek history
Classical scholars of the University of Oxford
New Zealand classical scholars
Contributors to the Oxford Classical Dictionary